Filat or FILAT may refer to

Vlad Filat, Moldovan politician
Filat, the Albanian name of the city and district of Filiates, Greece
FILAT, Forward-looking Infrared and Laser Attack Targeting pod

See also